Wintermute may refer to:

People
H. Ogden Wintermute (1895–1964) American writer and historian
Marjorie Wintermute (1919–2007) American architect 
Slim Wintermute (1917–1977), American basketball player
Martha Wintermute (1842–1918), American author and poet

Other uses
 An artificial intelligence character in the novel Neuromancer
Wintermute Engine, a graphical adventure game engine developed by Dead:Code software
 Wintermute, first story mode episode of the video game The Long Dark
Wintermute Lake, a lake in Minnesota